Serhiy Potalov (: Sergei Potalov) is a Ukrainian former pair skater. He teamed up with Olena Bilousivska in mid-1994. In autumn 1995, they won silver at the Nebelhorn Trophy and bronze at Skate Israel. They placed in the top ten at the 1995 European Championships in Dortmund, the 1996 European Championships in Sofia, and the 1996 World Championships in Edmonton. The pair was coached by Halyna Kukhar.

Results 
(with Bilousivska)

References 

1970s births
Ukrainian male pair skaters
Living people